Senator Thibodeau may refer to:

Michael Thibodeau (born 1966), Maine State Senate
Theresa Thibodeau (born 1975), Nebraska State Senate

See also
Pat Thibaudeau (fl. 1990s–2000s), Washington State Senate